Praweenwat Boonyong (born February 13, 1990), simply known as Big, is a Thai professional footballer who plays as a centre back for Thai League 2 club Nakhon Si United and the Thailand national team.

International career

He represented Thailand U-23 in the 2013 Southeast Asian Games. Pravinwat is part of Thailand's squad in the 2014 AFF Suzuki Cup. In May 2015, he was called up by Thailand to play in the 2018 FIFA World Cup qualification (AFC) against Vietnam.

International

International goals

Under-23

Honours

Club
Bangkok Glass
 Thai FA Cup: 2014

International
Thailand U-23
 Sea Games Gold Medal: 2013
Thailand
 ASEAN Football Championship: 2014, 2016

Individual
 Sea Games top scorer: 2013

References

External links

1990 births
Living people
Praweenwat Boonyong
Praweenwat Boonyong
Association football central defenders
Praweenwat Boonyong
Praweenwat Boonyong
Praweenwat Boonyong
Praweenwat Boonyong
Praweenwat Boonyong
Praweenwat Boonyong
Praweenwat Boonyong
Southeast Asian Games medalists in football
Competitors at the 2013 Southeast Asian Games
Nakhon Si United F.C. players